The Chief Justice of Texas presides at the Texas Supreme Court, which is the top appellate court for civil matters in the Texas court system.  The chief justice (and all the justices) are elected statewide in partisan elections.  The term of the chief justice is six years.  The position was created in the Texas Constitution of 1876.  The current chief justice is Nathan L. Hecht.

Chief justices

Chief Justices of the Texas Supreme Court
Lists of Texas politicians